Air Seychelles is the national airline of the Republic of Seychelles. Its head office is located at Seychelles International Airport on the island of Mahé and it operates inter-island and international flights and charter flights.

History

Establishment
It was renamed Air Seychelles in September 1978. The airline began international routes in 1983 to Frankfurt and London.

Investment
In February 2012, the United Arab Emirates national carrier, Etihad Airways, invested US$45 million in Air Seychelles for a 40% share in the airline following problems of management and profitability. After operating at a loss for two years in a row, Air Seychelles planned to restructure and re-position itself to return to profit. The airline entered into codeshare agreements with Etihad Airways and started flying to Abu Dhabi in March 2012 to connect to Etihad Airways' network of destinations.

On 16 March 2012, Air Seychelles announced a two-year business plan including the renewal of its fleet, leveraging Etihad Airways equity partnership – known as Etihad Airways Partners (which also includes Alitalia, Air Serbia and Virgin Australia), the introduction of Airbus A330−200 aircraft after over two decades of an all-Boeing fleet, increased frequencies to key destinations, and closer cooperation with Etihad Airways.

On 12 March 2015, Air Seychelles released their results for 2014, declaring US$3.2 million in net profits.

Restructuring
In January 2018, Air Seychelles announced the closure of its sole long-haul route (Paris), the return of its two Airbus A330 long-haul aircraft, and a focus on its regional network. The plan is aimed at ensuring the long-term profitability and sustainability for the airline, in response to rapidly increasing competition. Remco Althuis, Interim CEO, said, 'The launch of competing air services from Europe to Seychelles will significantly impact Air Seychelles' flights to and from Paris, which account for approximately 30% of total passenger revenue at the airline, making the route unsustainable.' The airline will refocus on its domestic and regional networks, with a reduced workforce.

Corporate affairs

Ownership
Air Seychelles was established and originally owned by the Government of Seychelles, having purchased and merged several small aircraft operators into one airline. Following problems of management and profitability, Etihad Airways acquired a 40 percent stake in Air Seychelles in 2012, in a deal worth $45m.
On 1 May 2021 it was announced Etihad Airways sold its 40% stake back to the Government of Seychelles for $1.

Business trends
The key trends for Air Seychelles over recent years are shown below (as at year ending 31 December):

Services
Air Seychelles VIP is a specialised facility offering services for VIP passengers, aircraft crew and aeronautical technical support, including fixed-base operation which is managed in conjunction with Royal Jet.

The Air Seychelles Plus Programme has been fully integrated into Etihad Guest, the loyalty programme of Etihad Airways, since June 2012.

Destinations
As of January 2020, Air Seychelles serves the following destinations:

Codeshare agreements
Air Seychelles has codeshare agreements with the following airlines:
 Air India
 South African Airways

Fleet

Current fleet
, the Air Seychelles fleet comprises the following aircraft:

Livery
In October 2011, after nearly 25 years in their livery using traditional red, white and green local colours with two white terns (Gygis alba, the national bird of Seychelles), Air Seychelles painted its first Boeing 767-300ER aircraft in the company's new colours. The colours used on the tail end are blue, green, red and white.

References

Further reading

External links

Official website

Airlines of Seychelles
Etihad Airways Partners
Airlines established in 1977
Government-owned airlines
Vanilla Alliance
1977 establishments in Africa